The 1932 Cork Junior Hurling Championship was the 36th staging of the Cork Junior Hurling Championship since its establishment by the Cork County Board.

On 13 November 1932, Lough Rovers won the championship following a 5–04 to 4–01 defeat of Skibberreen in the final at Clonakilty Sportsfield. It remains their only championship title.

References

Cork Junior Hurling Championship
Cork Junior Hurling Championship